Bridgeville is a town in Sussex County, Delaware, United States. According to the 2010 census, the population is 2,048, an increase of 42.6% from the previous decade. It is part of the Salisbury, Maryland-Delaware Metropolitan Statistical Area.

History
The town of Bridgeville is the oldest community in western Sussex County. Records of land transactions which were made in the first quarter of the 18th century suggest that a significant agricultural community already existed in the area by that period. A small group of houses had been built along the present Main Street by the turn of the 19th century; this settlement was known as "Bridge Branch" for the nearby stream, which was crossed by a bridge as early as 1730. By 1804, the community had grown sufficiently to merit the establishment of a post office. The village was formally recognized in 1810, when an Act of the Assembly was passed to establish its name as "Bridgeville".  Early 19th century industries included a water-powered mill, tanyard, charcoal furnace, and fruit-drying business. The growth of the town accelerated greatly upon the arrival of the Delaware Railroad in Bridgeville in 1856.  The town was subsequently laid out for development by William Cannon (1809-1865).

Bridgeville's population was 613 in 1900. 

Bridgeville was named for a bridge that was built in 1730 that was located over a tributary of the Nanticoke River.

The Bridgeville Historic District, Bridgeville Public Library, Eratt House, Old Bridgeville Fire House, Ricards House-Linden Hall, Scott's Store, Sudler House, and Trinity Methodist Episcopal Church are listed on the National Register of Historic Places.

Transportation

Roads are the main means of transport to and from Bridgeville. U.S. Route 13 (Sussex Highway) is the primary north-south highway serving the town, connecting northward to Dover and southward to Salisbury. Delaware Route 404 is the main east-west highway serving Bridgeville, heading east towards Georgetown and west towards Maryland. The two roads are concurrent for part of their route through Bridgeville as they both bypass the center of town to the north and east. U.S. Route 13 Business and Delaware Route 404 Business follow their respective original alignments through the center of town.  DART First State operates the Route 212 bus that connects Bridgeville with Delmar and Georgetown.  The Delmarva Central Railroad's Delmarva Subdivision line passes north-south through Bridgeville.

Geography
Bridgeville is located at  (38.7426137, –75.6043714).

Demographics

At the 2000 census there were 1,436 people, 570 households, and 381 families living in the town. The racial makeup of the town was 55.85% White, 31.55% African American, 0.28% Native American, 0.70% Asian, 8.91% from other races, and 2.72% from two or more races. Hispanic or Latino of any race were 16.64%.

Of the 570 households 33.9% had children under the age of 18 living with them, 40.7% were married couples living together, 20.9% had a female householder with no husband present, and 33.0% were non-families. 27.4% of households were one person and 12.1% were one person aged 65 or older. The average household size was 2.52 and the average family size was 3.02.

The age distribution was 28.7% under the age of 18, 8.8% from 18 to 24, 27.0% from 25 to 44, 19.4% from 45 to 64, and 16.0% 65 or older. The median age was 33 years. For every 100 females, there were 90.7 males. For every 100 females age 18 and over, there were 85.8 males.

The median household income was $26,579 and the median family income  was $30,083. Males had a median income of $25,536 versus $20,298 for females. The per capita income for the town was $14,965. About 24.9% of families and 27.4% of the population were below the poverty line, including 42.5% of those under age 18 and 13.9% of those age 65 or over.

Education
Most of Bridgeville is situated in the Woodbridge School District, while a small portion is in the Seaford School District. The Woodbridge district's high school is Woodbridge High School and the Seaford district's high school is Seaford Senior High School.

Arts and culture 
Bridgeville is home to the Apple Scrapple Festival and was formerly home to the World Championship Punkin Chunkin.

Notable people

Thurman Adams, Jr., Democratic member of the Delaware Senate; born in Bridgeville
William F. Allen, Democratic member of the Delaware General Assembly and the United States House of Representatives; born in Bridgeville
Philip L. Cannon, first Lieutenant Governor of Delaware (1901–1905) and son of William Cannon; born in Bridgeville 
William Cannon, served in the Delaware General Assembly and as Governor of Delaware during much of the Civil War; born in Bridgeville
Peter F. Causey, Governor of Delaware from 1855 to 1859
Edward Willis Redfield, impressionist painter

References

External links
 

 Town of Bridgeville Delaware Portal style website, Government, Business, Library, Recreation and more

Towns in Sussex County, Delaware
Towns in Delaware
Salisbury metropolitan area